Sart-Lobovo (Hart-Labaw) is a rural locality (a selo) in Ukteyevsky Selsoviet, Iglinsky District, Bashkortostan, Russia. The population was 423 as of 2010. There are 8 streets.

Geography 
Sart-Lobovo is located on the left bank of the Lobovka River, 11 km northeast of Iglino (the district's administrative centre) by road. Minzitarovo is the nearest rural locality.

References 

Rural localities in Iglinsky District